James Barnett (May 18, 1810 Orange County, Vermont – July 23, 1874 Oneida, Madison County, New York) was an American politician from New York.

Life
The family removed to Madison County, New York, in 1817. James attended the common schools, and worked on his father's farm. In 1832, he became a merchant's clerk, and in 1836 opened his own business in Fayetteville, Onondaga County. On March 23, 1836, he married Julia Ann Rich (1816–1848), and they had five children. In 1838, he removed to Peterboro. On December 25, 1848, he married Ellen King (1812–1874), and they had two daughters.

He entered politics as a Democrat; became a friend of Gerrit Smith and was a member of the Liberty Party; and joined the Republican Party upon its foundation.

He was Supervisor of the Town of Smithfield in 1846 and 1847; and a member of the New York State Assembly (Madison Co., 2nd D.) in 1860. He was elected a Justice of the Peace in 1860; and was a member of the New York State Senate (23rd D.) in 1866 and 1867.

Sources
 The New York Civil List compiled by Franklin Benjamin Hough, Stephen C. Hutchins and Edgar Albert Werner (1870; pg. 444)
 Life Sketches of the State Officers, Senators, and Members of the Assembly of the State of New York, in 1867 by S. R. Harlow & H. H. Boone (pg. 71ff)
 Peterboro Village Cemetery records transcribed at RootsWeb
 Blog about James Barnett
 History of Smithfield, NY at Ray's Place

1810 births
1874 deaths
Republican Party New York (state) state senators
People from Smithfield, New York
People from Orange County, Vermont
Republican Party members of the New York State Assembly
Town supervisors in New York (state)
New York (state) Libertyites
Activists from New York (state)